Amnibacterium is a genus of bacteria from the family of Microbacteriaceae.

References

Further reading 
 

Microbacteriaceae
Bacteria genera